Heinz Willeg (1918–1991) was a German film producer. During the 1960s he produced a number of crime and thriller films including the Jerry Cotton series starring George Nader.

Selected filmography
 The Bird Seller (1953)
 On the Reeperbahn at Half Past Midnight (1954)
 Love Is Forever (1954)
 The Happy Village (1955)
 Charley's Aunt (1956)
 Vater sein dagegen sehr (1957)
 Spring in Berlin (1957)
 Peter Voss, Thief of Millions (1958)
 The Copper (1958)
 Two Hearts in May (1958)
 The Muzzle (1958)
 Roses for the Prosecutor (1959)
 When the Heath Is in Bloom (1960)
 The Young Sinner (1960)
 The Avenger (1960)
 The Last Witness (1960)
 Three Men in a Boat (1961)
 The Gypsy Baron (1962)
 The Monster of London City (1964)
 The Shoot (1964)
 The Phantom of Soho (1964)
 The Last Tomahawk (1965)
 Tread Softly (1965)
 Manhattan Night of Murder (1965)
 The Trap Snaps Shut at Midnight (1966)
 Die Rechnung – eiskalt serviert (1966)
 Murderers Club of Brooklyn (1967)
 When Night Falls on the Reeperbahn (1967)
 Death and Diamonds (1968)
 Death in the Red Jaguar (1968)
 Dead Body on Broadway (1969)
 Charley's Uncle (1969)
 On the Reeperbahn at Half Past Midnight (1969)
 That Can't Shake Our Willi! (1970)
 The Priest of St. Pauli (1970)
 Hotel by the Hour (1970)
 Jailbreak in Hamburg (1971)
 Twenty Girls and the Teachers (1971)
 The Heath Is Green (1972)

References

Bibliography 
 Peter Cowie & Derek Elley. World Filmography: 1967. Fairleigh Dickinson University Press, 1977.

External links 
 

1918 births
1991 deaths
German film producers
Film people from Berlin